Khaaliqa Nimji (born 13 March 1998) is a Kenyan female squash player. She has represented  Kenya at the 2010 Commonwealth Games, 2014 Commonwealth Games, 2018 Commonwealth Games and 2022 Commonwealth Games. She was one of the fewest squash women players to have represented Kenya at the Commonwealth Games as Kenya sent a delegation of squash women players for the first time at the 2010 Commonwealth Games which was held in New Delhi, India.

Biography 
Khaaliqa Nimji was born in Nairobi on 13 March 1998 to Sadri Nimji (Father) and Salima Nimji (Mother). Khaaliqa started playing squash when she was just two years old with the help of her father. She educated at the Peponi School. 

Khaaliqa is the youngest Kenyan to have represented Kenya at multi-sport event at the age of twelve in the 2010 Commonwealth Games. She was also the youngest competitor during the 2010 Commonwealth Games. Prior to the 2010 Commonwealth Games, she was not granted the permission to compete at the multi-sport event which was held in New Delhi because she was regarded as too young by the Kenyan squash chairman at the time. But with time, she was eventually allowed to travel.

References 

1998 births
Living people
Kenyan female squash players
Squash players at the 2010 Commonwealth Games
Squash players at the 2014 Commonwealth Games
Squash players at the 2018 Commonwealth Games
Commonwealth Games competitors for Kenya
Sportspeople from Nairobi